İmamlar can refer to:

 İmamlar, Bartın
 İmamlar, Çameli
 İmamlar, Gerede